Darnley Da Costa (30 March 1877 – 9 July 1966) was a Barbadian cricketer. He played in five first-class matches for the Barbados cricket team from 1898 to 1901.

See also
 List of Barbadian representative cricketers

References

External links
 

1877 births
1966 deaths
Barbadian cricketers
Barbados cricketers
People from Saint Michael, Barbados